Shelby Slawson (born May 3, 1977) is an American attorney, businesswoman, and politician. She has represented the 59th District in the Texas House of Representatives since 2021. A member of the Republican Party, Slawson is also an attorney and small business owner.

Early life
She was born and raised in Texas. She graduated from Stephenville High School. She attended University of Texas at Dallas earning an undergraduate degree in government and politics in 2000. She earned her Juris Doctor from the University of Texas School of Law in 2003.

Career

Business 
Since then she started and worked in small businesses, including Erath Rentals, Slawson Roofing, Inc., StephenvilleForRent.com, and as an attorney for her law firm.

Slawson served as an appointed board member for the Stephenville Economic Development Authority (SEDA).

Politics 
In 2018, Slawson ran for Erath County judge, losing to Alfonso Campos in a runoff election in the Republican primary.

Shelby filed in June 2019 to run for the Texas House of Representatives District 59 seat, running against incumbent J. D. Sheffield. She defeated Sheffield in the 2020 Republican primary runoff with 62% of the vote in July 2020. Slawson ran unopposed in the November 2020 election. Slawson had endorsements from Sid Miller and Pat Fallon.

On March 11, 2021, state senator Bryan Hughes of Mineola, Texas introduced a six-week abortion ban entitled the Texas Heartbeat Bill (SB8) into the state senate, while Slawson introduced a companion bill (HB1515) into the Texas House.  The bill allowed private citizens to sue those who performed abortions after detection of a fetal heartbeat.  The SB8 version of the bill passed both chambers and was signed into law by Texas Governor Greg Abbott on May 19, 2021. It took effect on September 1, 2021.

References

External links
 Campaign website
 State legislative page

1977 births
Living people
Republican Party members of the Texas House of Representatives
21st-century American politicians
21st-century American women politicians
Women state legislators in Texas
University of Texas at Dallas alumni
University of Texas School of Law alumni
People from Stephenville, Texas
American lawyers
Texas lawyers